Niebuhr is a German surname. Notable people with the surname include:

Barthold Georg Niebuhr, (1776–1831), 19th-century German statesman and historian
Carsten Niebuhr, (1733–1815), 18th-century German traveller, explorer and surveyor, and father of Barthold Georg Niebuhr (sometimes mistakenly called by his son's first name)
 H. Richard Niebuhr (1894–1962), Christian ethicist
 Reinhold Niebuhr (1892–1971), Christian theologian (brother of H. Richard Niebuhr)

See also
Neubauer
Neugebauer

German-language surnames